Bhikhudan Govindbhai Gadhvi (born 1948) is an Indian folk singer and songwriter, known as a proponent of Dayro, a narrative singing tradition of Gujarat. He is a recipient of the Gujarat Gaurav Award of the Government of Gujarat and the Sangeet Natak Akademi Award. The Government of India awarded him the fourth highest civilian honour of the Padma Shri, in 2016, for his contributions to folk music.

Biography 
Bhikhudan Gadhvi was born on 19 September 1948 in Manekvada, a village in Junagadh district of the Indian state of Gujarat. He started singing at the age of ten and after completing his secondary school education, he made his debut as a singer at the age of 20. Reading the works of Jhaverchand Meghani and Dula Bhaya Kag early in his life is reported to have inspired Gadhvi to take up song writing and he focused on Dayro tradition, a folk music tradition of Gujarat where the performer sings narrative stories. He has since performed in many countries such as the US, UK and Indonesia and has over 350 audio albums to credit which include popular tracks like Bhadanu Makan and Khandaninu Khamir.

Gadhvi received the Gujarat Gaurav Award of the Government of Gujarat before the Sangeet Natak Akademi awarded him the Akademi Puraskar in 2009. The Government of India included him the Republic Day honors list for the civilian honor of the Padma Shri in 2016. He is also a recipient of the Shri Dula Bhaya Kag Award. He is married to Gajraba and they have a son, Bharatbhai. The family lives in Junagadh in Gujarat.

Selected discography

See also 

 Music of Gujarat
Charan
 Jhaverchand Meghani
 Dula Bhaya Kag

References

External links

Further reading 
 

Recipients of the Padma Shri in arts
Recipients of the Sangeet Natak Akademi Award
1948 births
People from Porbandar district
Indian male singer-songwriters
Indian male folk singers
Gujarati people
Gujarati-language singers
Living people
Singers from Gujarat
Charan
Gadhavi (surname)